The 1923 UCI Road World Championships took place in Zürich, Switzerland on 25 August 1923.

Events summary

Medal table

Results
The course was 164 km.

See also
 1923 UCI Track Cycling World Championships

References

UCI Road World Championships by year
W
R
International cycle races hosted by Switzerland
Sport in Zürich
20th century in Zürich
August 1923 sports events